Address: 30 Laurel Grove Road, Middletown, Connecticut
Style: Center-Chimney Colonial
Date of Construction: 1741
Materials: Clapboard and Brownstone Foundation with Wood shingle roof
Structural System: Wood frame and Post and Beam
Architect: Unknown
Builder: Unknown
Historic Use: Residence
Present Use: Residence

Relationship to surroundings 

This center-chimney Colonial house faces west from the east side of Laurel Grove Road near the intersection of Wadsworth Street. It is set back behind a yard with a stone wall bordering the property near the road. Across the street is the Nehemiah Hubbard House (c. 1730). Laurel Grove Road is an unpaved lane with tall shading scattered residences.

Significance 

This house originally stood on the Main Street of Durham, Connecticut near the site of the Durham Manufacturing Company. It was probably built around 1741 by Robert Smithson. In 1957 it was moved to its present site. It is remembered in Durham as the Harriet Cooper Lane House after a long-term former occupant.

This house displays the center-chimney, two-room deep plan typical of mid-18th-century hose construction. In its well-preserved condition it complements the Nehemiah Hubbard House across the street. Together these two houses make the entrance into Laurel Grove Road a pleasing streetscape reminiscent of the 18th century.

On March 27, 2021, a fire occurred at this house. 
Significant damage occurred and the house will take a few years to rebuild.

Current use 

The house is still a residential home and is kept in good condition.

References 

Middletown, Connecticut Historical and Architectural Resources. Volume III, Card Number 147. Roger Sherman. March 1978.

Houses on the National Register of Historic Places in Connecticut
Houses in Middletown, Connecticut
Durham, Connecticut
National Register of Historic Places in Middlesex County, Connecticut